Robbie Stamp (born 1960) was the CEO of The Digital Village, a position that came about partly because of his friendship with author Douglas Adams, whose works inspired the site. Stamp was also the executive producer of the movie version of The Hitchhiker's Guide to the Galaxy.

Stamp was a producer of television documentaries when he met Adams. Under his tenure at The Digital Village, the h2g2 project was launched, along with the computer game Starship Titanic.

He is currently Chairman of Bioss International Ltd.

Bibliography
Young, Martin & Stamp, Robbie 1989, Trojan horses : extraordinary stories of deception operations in the Second World War, Bodley Head, London
Kennett, Sue & Stamp, Robbie & Groman, Jeff & Naden, David 1989, The day war broke out, Marshall Cavendish, [London]
Prins, Gwyn & Stamp, Robbie & International Film Bureau & Millbank Films 1991, Top guns & toxic whales : the environment & global security, Earthscan Publications ; Post Mills, VT : Chelsea Green Pub. Co, London
Stamp, Robbie & Simpson, Paul, 1963- & Adams, Douglas, 1952-. Hitch-hiker's guide to the galaxy 2005, The making of The hitchhiker's guide to the galaxy : the filming of the Douglas Adams classic, Boxtree, London

References

External links 
Transcript of webchat with Robbie Stamp on April 12, 2005

1960 births
Living people